Kirkby-in-Ashfield is a market town in the Ashfield district of Nottinghamshire, England.  The town and its surrounding area contain 18 listed buildings that are recorded in the National Heritage List for England. All the listed buildings are designated at Grade II, the lowest of the three grades, which is applied to "buildings of national importance and special interest".  Most of the listed buildings consist of houses, farmhouses, farm buildings and associated structures.  The other listed buildings are a village cross, a pinfold, a well head, a church, a war memorial and a telephone kiosk.


Buildings

References

Citations

Sources

 

Lists of listed buildings in Nottinghamshire
Listed